is a city in Aichi Prefecture, Japan. , the city had an estimated population of 377,453 in 160,516 households  and a population density of 1,400 persons per km2. By area, Toyohashi was Aichi Prefecture's second-largest city until March 31, 2005 when it was surpassed by the city of Toyota, which had merged with six peripheral municipalities.

Geography
Toyohashi is located in southeastern Aichi Prefecture, and is the capital of the informal "Higashi-Mikawa Region" of the prefecture. It is bordered by Shizuoka Prefecture to the east, and by Mikawa Bay and the headlands of the Atsumi Peninsula to the west. To the south is the Enshu Bay of the Pacific Ocean. The presence of the warm Kuroshio Current offshore gives the city a temperate climate. The  in Toyohashi is a sea turtle nesting spot.

Climate
The city has a climate characterized by hot and humid summers, and relatively mild winters (Köppen climate classification Cfa).

Demographics

Per Japanese census data, the population of Toyohashi has grown steadily over the past 60 years.

Neighboring municipalities
Aichi Prefecture
Toyokawa
Shinshiro
Tahara
Shizuoka Prefecture
Kita-ku, Hamamatsu
Kosai

City scape

History

Origins
The area around present-day Toyohashi has been inhabited for many thousands of years.
Archaeologists have found human remains from the Japanese Paleolithic period, which have been carbon dated to more than 10,000 BC along with the bones of Naumann elephants.

Numerous remains from the Jōmon period, and especially from the Yayoi and Kofun periods have also been found, including many kofun burial mounds.

During the Nara period, the area was assigned to Atsumi, Hoi and Yana Districts of Mikawa Province and prospered during subsequent periods as a post town on an important river crossing of the Tōkaidō connecting the capital with the eastern provinces.

Sengoku period
During the Sengoku period, the area was a highly contested zone between the Imagawa clan based in Suruga Province and various local warlords, who built a number of fortifications in the area, including Yoshida Castle.
The rising power of the Matsudaira clan and its alliance with Oda Nobunaga eventually neutralized the threat posed by the Imagawa, and the area became part of the holdings of Tokugawa Ieyasu.
Following the Battle of Odawara in 1590, Toyotomi Hideyoshi ordered the Tokugawa clan to relocate to the Kantō region and assigned the castle to Ikeda Terumasa. Ikeda developed the surrounding castle town and embarked on a massive and ambitious plan to rebuild Yoshida Castle. However, following the Battle of Sekigahara, he was relocated to Himeji Castle.

Edo period
After the establishment of the Tokugawa shogunate, Yoshida Castle became the center of Yoshida Domain, a clan fief. The domain was assigned to several different fudai daimyō clans until coming into the possession of the Matsudaira (Nagasawa-Ōkōchi) clan in 1752, which remained in residence at Yoshida until the Meiji Restoration. 
The final daimyō of Yoshida, Matsudaira Nobuhisa, surrendered the domain to the Meiji government in 1868. In 1869, the name of the domain was formally changed from Yoshida to Toyohashi.

Meiji period
With the establishment of the modern municipalities system under the Meiji government in 1879, Toyohashi Town was created within Atsumi District, Aichi Prefecture. Toyohashi Zoo was established in 1899.
The town achieved city status in 1906.

Taishō period
A tram system (the present-day Toyohashi Railway Asumadai Main Line) was established in 1925.

Shōwa period
In 1932, Toyohashi expanded its borders by annexing Shimoji Town (Hoi District), Takashi Village, Muroyoshida Village (Atsumi District), and Shimokawa Village (Yana District).
Toyohashi suffered considerable damage during the 1944 Tōnankai earthquake, and even more damage during the Toyohashi Air Raid, which destroyed more than 60% of the city in June 1945.

Modern Toyohashi
In 1955, Toyohashi's geographic extent was expanded again with the annexation of neighboring Maeshiba Village (Hoi District), Futagawa Village, Takatoyo Village, Oitsu Village (Atsumi District) and Ishimaki Village (Yana District). Toyohashi achieved core city status in 1999 with increased autonomy from the prefectural government.

Government

Mayor-council
Toyohashi has a mayor-council form of government with a directly elected mayor and a unicameral city legislature of 36 members.

Prefectural Assembly
The city contributes five members to the Aichi Prefectural Assembly.

House of Representatives
In terms of national politics, the city is part of Aichi District15 of the lower house of the Diet of Japan.

List of mayors of Toyohashi (from 1907)

Public

Police
Aichi Prefectural Police
Toyohashi police station

Firefighting
Toyohashi Fire department
Toyohashi-Minami fire department
Toyohashi-Naka fire department

Health care
Hospital
Toyohashi City Hospital

Post office
Toyohashi Post office
Toyohashi-Minami Post office

Library
Toyohashi City Library
Toyohashi City Central Library
Toyohashi City Mukaiyama Liburary
Toyohashi City Oshimizu Liburary（Minakuru）

International relations

Twin towns/sister cities
Sister cities
 – Nantong, Jiangsu, China, since May 1987
 – Toledo, Ohio, United States since April 2000
 – Panevėžys, Lithuania since June 2019
Friendship cities
 - Jinju, South Gyeongsang, South Korea, since 1992
 - Paranavaí, Paraná, Brazil, since 2008
 – Wolfsburg, Lower Saxony, Germany since 2011

Economy

Primary sector of the economy

Agriculture
Cabbage
Napa cabbage
Tomato
Diospyros kaki
Pyrus pyrifolia
Grape
Chikuwa
Japan Agricultural Cooperatives
JA Toyohashi

Secondary sector of the economy
Industrial production is centered around the production of automotive-related components for Toyota, Mitsubishi, Suzuki Motors, and Honda, all of whom have factories in the region.
Motors
Toyota
Mitsubishi
Suzuki Motors
Honda
VOLKSWAGEN Group Japan

Tertiary sector of the economy
Worldwide trade
Mikawa Port is a major port for worldwide trade, and its presence has made Toyohashi the largest import and export hub in Japan for automobiles, in volume terms.  Compared to other ports around the world, Mikawa is roughly on a par with the German port of Bremerhaven.
Shopping center
APiTA Mukaiyama
Æon Toyohashi-Minami Shopping center
Æon Town Toyohasihashira
Cocola Avenue

Media

Studio
FM Toyohashi (JOZZ6AA-FM, 84.30 MHz)

Newspaper
Higashi Aichi Newspaper
Tonichi Shimbun Newspaper

Education

University
National university
Toyohashi University of Technology
Private university
Aichi University
Toyohashi Sozo College
Private college
Aichi Junior College

Primary and secondary schools
Toyohashi has 52 public elementary schools and 22 public middle schools operated by the city government, and eight public high schools operated by the Aichi Prefectural Board of Education. The city also has one private middle school and  three private high schools. The prefecture also operated three special education schools for the handicapped.

International schools
  - Brazilian school
  - Brazilian primary school
 EJA Interativo – Educação de Jovens e Adultos - Brazilian institution
  - North Korean school

Transportation

Railway
Toyohashi Station is on the Tōkaidō Shinkansen and the Tōkaidō Main Line. Hikari shinkansen services stop at Toyohashi Station approximately once every two hours, and Kodama services stop twice an hour. Toyohashi Station is also the terminus of the Iida Line, Meitetsu Nagoya Main Line, Toyohashi Railroad Atsumi Line, and the Toyohashi Railroad Azumada Main Line, making it an important transportation hub.

Highspeed rail
Central Japan Railway Company
Tōkaidō Shinkansen：

Conventional lines
Central Japan Railway Company
Tōkaidō Main Line：
Iida Line：
Meitetsu
Meitetsu Nagoya Line：
Toyotetsu
Toyohashi Railroad Atsumi Line：

Tramway
Toyotetsu
Toyohashi Railroad Azumada Main Line：Ekimae-ōdōriShinkawaFudagiShiyakushomaeToyohashi-kōenmaeHigashi-hatchōMaehataAzumada-sakaueAzumadaKeirinjōmaeIharaAkaiwaguchi
IharaUndōkōen-mae

Bus
Almost all services are operated by Toyotetsu Bus, a subsidiary of Toyohashi Railroad.

Roads

Highway
  Tomei Expressway

Japan National Route

Sea port
Port of Toyohashi（Port of Mikawa）

Local attractions

Places of interest

Site of Nirengi Castle
, a National Important Cultural Property .
, a National Important Cultural Property
Futagawa-juku honjin museum
 Toyohashi Zoo
 Toyohashi Natural History Museum
Toyohashi Museum of Natural Resources

Facilities and parks
Toyohashi has many parks, including the Natural History Museum and Zoological Park, the Imou swamp, Mikawa Seaside Forest, Kamo Iris Garden, and the Mukaiyama Ume Garden. It also has what is considered one of the best surfing beaches in Aichi and the surrounding region.

Culture

Festivals
Toyohashi Festival, Spring Festival, Iris Flower Festival, Gion Festival, Demon Festival (February), and traditional marionette performances (Akumi joruri). At some of these festivals, especially the summer festivals, the use of traditionally handcrafted fireworks is showcased, and include hand-held bamboo-tube fireworks known as tezutsu hanabi.

Special products
Chikuwa (a type of baked sausage roll made from fish), beach fermented soybeans, food boiled in goby fish and soy, top producer of quail eggs in Japan, .

In popular culture
In the fictional Harry Potter universe, Toyohashi is the hometown of the professional Quidditch team, the Toyohashi Tengu.

In the Takeshi Kitano movie Kikujiro, the story revolves around the characters' trip from Tokyo to Toyohashi.

Sports

Basketball
San-en NeoPhoenix（Toyohashi City General Gymnasium）

Baseball
Chunichi Dragons（Toyohashi Municipal Baseball Stadium）

Gallery

Notable people from Toyohashi

Katsuhito Asano, Japanese politician
Buyūzan Takeyoshi, sumo wrestler
Daniel (Nushiro) of Japan, primate of Japanese Orthodox Church
Atsushi Fujii, professional baseball player
Emi Fujino, mixed martial artist, kickboxer and professional wrestler
Mizuki Inoue, kickboxer and mixed martial artist
Yoshitaka Iwamizu, Olympic long-distance runner
Kitaro, musician
Aya Kitō, writer
Masaji Kiyokawa, Olympic gold-medalist swimmer
Masatoshi Koshiba, Nobel Prize winner
Ken Matsudaira, actor
Rena Matsui, actress, former member of SKE48
Yūji Mitsuya, actor, voice actor
Masahiko Morifuku, professional baseball player
Sakura Nogawa, voice actress
Kenichi Ogawa, boxer
Yoshio Sawai, manga artist
Akiko Suzuki, professional figure skater
Sakon Yamamoto, professional race car driver
Yua Aida, AV idol and model

See also
 18th Infantry Regiment (Imperial Japanese Army)
 Black Thunder (chocolate bar)
 Nirengi Castle
 Nishikawa Castle
 Siege of Yoshida Castle
 Toyohashi Air Raid
 Toyokawa Bridge

References

External links

  

 
Cities in Aichi Prefecture
Port settlements in Japan
Populated coastal places in Japan